The Romanian ambassador in Tel Aviv is the official representative of the Government in Bucharest to the Government of Israel.

List of representatives

References 

 
Israel
Romania